Live at SOB's is a live album released by American musician John Legend. Recorded June 28 and December 6, 2002 at SOB's in New York, it was produced by longtime collaborator Dave Tozer.

Track listing
"Set It Off" – 4:04
"Alright" – 3:34
"Lifted" – 3:58
"Soul Joint" – 4:02
"Hurts So Bad" – 5:12
"Sun Comes Up" – 8:00
"The Wrong Way" – 4:13
"Motherless Child" – 4:23
"Burning Down the House"  – 2:42
"Without You"  – 4:06

John Legend albums
Albums produced by Dave Tozer
2002 live albums